The tragic play Macbeth by William Shakespeare has appeared and been reinterpreted in many forms of art and culture since it was written in the early 17th century.

In film
The earliest known film Macbeth was 1905's American short Death Scene From Macbeth, and short versions were produced in Italy in 1909 and France in 1910. Two notable early versions are lost: Ludwig Landmann produced a 47-minute version in Germany in 1913, and D. W. Griffith produced a 1916 version in America featuring the noted stage actor Herbert Beerbohm Tree. Tree is said to have had great difficulties adapting to the new medium, and especially in confining himself to the small number of lines in the (silent) screenplay, until an ingenious cameraman allowed him to play his entire part to an empty camera, after which a real camera shot the film.

Twentieth century

In 1947, David Bradley produced an independent film of Macbeth, intended for distribution to schools, most notable for the designer of its eighty-three costumes: the soon-to-be-famous Charlton Heston.

Orson Welles' 1948 Macbeth, in the director's words a "violently sketched charcoal drawing of a great play," was filmed in only 23 days and on a budget of just $700,000. These filming conditions allowed only a single abstract set, and eclectic costumes. Dialogue was pre-recorded, enabling the actors to perform very long individual takes, including one of over ten minutes surrounding the death of Duncan. Welles himself played the central character, who dominates the film, measured both by his time on screen, and by physical presence: high-angle and low-angle shots and deep-focus close-ups are used to distort his size in comparison to other characters. Welles retained from his own 1936 stage production the image of a Voodoo doll controlling the fate of the central character: and at the end it is the doll we see beheaded. The film's allegorical aspect is heightened by Welles' introduction of a non-Shakespearean character, the Holy Father (played by Alan Napier), in opposition to the witches, speaking lines taken from Shakespeare's Ross, Angus and the Old Man. Contemporary reviews were largely negative, particularly criticising Welles' unsympathetic portrayal of the central character. Newsweek commented: "His Macbeth is a static, two-dimensional creature as capable of evil in the first scene as in the final hours of his bloody reign."

Joe MacBeth (Ken Hughes, 1955) established the tradition of resetting the Macbeth story among 20th-century gangsters. Others to do so include Men of Respect (William Reilly, 1991), Maqbool (Vishal Bhardwaj, 2003) and Geoffrey Wright's Australian 2006 Macbeth.

In 1957, Akira Kurosawa used the Macbeth story as the basis for the "universally acclaimed" Kumunosu-jo (in English known as Throne of Blood or (the literal translation of its title) Spiderweb Castle). The film is a Japanese period-piece (jidai-geki), drawing upon elements of Noh theatre, especially in its depiction of the evil spirit who takes the part of Shakespeare's witches, and of Asaji, the Lady Macbeth character, played by Isuzu Yamada, and upon Kabuki Theatre in its depiction of Washizu, the Macbeth character, played by Toshiro Mifune. In a twist on Shakespeare's ending, the tyrant (having witnessed Spiderweb Forest come to Spiderweb Castle) is killed by volleys of arrows from his own archers after they come to the realization he also lied about the identity of their former master's murderer.

George Schaefer directed Maurice Evans and Judith Anderson in a 1960 made-for-TV film which later had a limited European theatrical release. (The three had also worked together on the earlier Hallmark Hall of Fame 1954 TV version of the play.) Neither of the central couple was able to adapt their stage acting style to the screen successfully, leading to their roles being described by critics as "recited" rather than "acted".

Roman Polanski's 1971 Macbeth was the director's first film after the brutal murder of his wife, Sharon Tate, and reflected his determination to "show [Macbeths] violence the way it is ... [because] if you don't show it realistically then that's immoral and harmful." His film showed deaths only reported in the play, including the execution of Cawdor, and Macbeth stabbing Duncan, and its violence was "intense and incessant." Made in the aftermath of Zeffirelli's youthful Romeo and Juliet, and financed by Playboy mogul Hugh Hefner, Polanski's film featured a young sexy lead couple, played by Jon Finch (28) and by Francesca Annis (25), who controversially performed the sleepwalking scene nude. The unsettling film score, provided by the Third Ear Band, invoked "discord and dissonance." While using Shakespeare's words, Polanski alters aspects of Shakespeare's story, turning the minor character Ross into a ruthless Machiavellian, and adding an epilogue to the play in which Donalbain (younger son of Duncan) arrives at the witches' lair, indicating that the cycle of violence will begin again.

In 1973, the Virginia Museum Theater (VMT, now the Leslie Cheek Theater), presented Macbeth, starring E.G. Marshall.  Dubbed by the New York Times as the "'Fowler' Macbeth" after director Keith Fowler, it was described by Clive Barnes as "splendidly vigorous, forcefully immediate... probably the goriest Shakespearean production I have seen since Peter Brook's 'Titus Andronicus'."

Trevor Nunn's RSC Other Place stage performance starring Ian McKellen and Judi Dench as the leading couple was adapted for TV and broadcast by Thames Television (see Macbeth (1978 film)).

William Reilly's 1991 Men of Respect, another film to set the Macbeth story among gangsters, has been praised for its accuracy in depicting Mafia rituals, said to be more authentic than those in The Godfather or GoodFellas. However the film failed to please audiences or critics: Leonard Maltin found it "pretentious" and "unintentionally comic" and Daniel Rosenthal describes it as "providing the most risible chunks of modernised Shakespeare in screen history." In 1992 S4C produced a cel-animated Macbeth for the series Shakespeare: The Animated Tales, and in 1997 Jeremy Freeston directed Jason Connery and Helen Baxendale in a low budget, fairly full-text, version.

In Shakespeare's script, the actor playing Banquo must enter the stage as a ghost. The major film versions have usually taken the opportunity to provide a double perspective: Banquo visible to the audience from Macbeth's perspective, but invisible from the perspective of other characters. Television versions, however, have often taken the third approach of leaving Banquo invisible to viewers, thereby portraying Banquo's ghost as merely Macbeth's delusion. This approach is taken in the 1978 Thames TV production, Jack Gold's 1983 version for BBC Television Shakespeare, and in Penny Woolcock's 1997 Macbeth on the Estate. Macbeth on the Estate largely dispensed with the supernatural in favour of the drug-crime driven realism of characters living on a Birmingham housing estate: except for the three "weird" (in the modern sense of the word) children who prophesy Macbeth's fate. This production used Shakespeare's language, but encouraged the actors – many of whom were locals, not professionals – to speak it naturalistically.

Twenty-first century
Twenty-first-century cinema has re-interpreted Macbeth, relocating "Scotland" elsewhere: Maqbool to Mumbai, Scotland, PA to Pennsylvania, Geoffrey Wright's Macbeth to Melbourne, and Allison L. LiCalsi's 2001 Macbeth: The Comedy to a location only differentiated from the reality of New Jersey, where it was filmed, through signifiers such as tartan, Scottish flags and bagpipes. Alexander Abela's 2001 Makibefo was set among, and starred, residents of Faux Cap, a remote fishing community in Madagascar. Leonardo Henriquez' 2000 Sangrador (in English: Bleeder) set the story among Venezuelan bandits and presented a shockingly visualised horror version.

Billy Morrissette's Scotland, PA reframes the Macbeth story as a comedy-thriller set in a 1975 fast-food restaurant, and features James LeGros in the Macbeth role and Maura Tierney as Pat, the Lady Macbeth character: "We're not bad people, Mac. We're just under-achievers who have to make up for lost time." Christopher Walken plays vegetarian detective Ernie McDuff who (in the words of Daniel Rosenthal) "[applies] his uniquely offbeat menacing delivery to innocuous lines." Scotland, PAs conceit of resetting the Macbeth story at a restaurant was followed in BBC Television's 2005 ShakespeaRe-Told adaptation.

Vishal Bhardwaj's 2003 Maqbool, filmed in Hindi and Urdu and set in the Mumbai underworld, was produced in the Bollywood tradition, but heavily influenced by Macbeth, by Francis Ford Coppola's 1972 The Godfather and by Luc Besson's 1994 Léon. It deviates from the Macbeth story in making the Macbeth character (Miyan Maqbool, played by Irfan Khan) a single man, lusting after the mistress (Nimmi, played by Tabbu) of the Duncan character (Jahangir Khan, known as Abbaji, played by Pankaj Kapoor). Another deviation is the comparative delay in the murder: Shakespeare's protagonists murder Duncan early in the play, but more than half of the film has passed by the time Nimmi and Miyan kill Abbaji.

In 2004 an "eccentric" Swedish/Norwegian film, based on Alex Scherpf's Ice Globe Theatre production of Macbeth, was said by critic Daniel Rosenthal to owe "more to co-director Bo Landin's background in natural history documentaries than to Shakespeare." More conventional adaptations of 21st-century stage productions to television include Greg Doran's RSC production filmed in 2001 with Antony Sher and Harriet Walter in the central roles, and Rupert Goold's Chichester Festival Theatre Macbeth televised in 2010 with Patrick Stewart and Kate Fleetwood as the tragic couple. The cast of the latter felt that the history of their stage performance (moving from a small space at Chichester to a large proscenium arch stage in London to a huge auditorium in Brooklyn) made it easier for them to "re-scale", yet again, their performances for the cameras.

In 2006, Geoffrey Wright directed a Shakespearean-language, extremely violent Macbeth set in the Melbourne underworld. Sam Worthington played Macbeth. Victoria Hill played Lady Macbeth and shared the screenplay credits with Wright. The director considered her portrayal of Lady Macbeth to be the most sympathetic he had ever seen. In spite of the high level of violence and nudity (Macbeth has sex with the three naked schoolgirl witches as they prophesy his fate), intended to appeal to the young audiences that had flocked to Romeo + Juliet, the film flopped at the box office.

The 2011 short film Born Villain, directed by Shia LaBeouf and starring Marilyn Manson, was inspired by Macbeth and features multiple scenes where characters quote from it.

In 2014, Classic Alice wove a 10 episode arc placing its characters in the world of Macbeth. The adaptation uses students and a modern-day setting to loosely parallel Shakespeare's play. It starred Kate Hackett, Chris O'Brien, Elise Cantu and Tony Noto and embarked on an LGBTQ plotline.

Justin Kurzel's feature-length adaptation Macbeth, starring Michael Fassbender and Marion Cotillard, was released in October 2015.

Also in 2015, Brazilian film A Floresta que se Move (The Moving Forest) premiered at the Montreal World Film Festival. Directed by Vinícius Coimbra and starred by Gabriel Braga Nunes and Ana Paula Arósio, the film uses a modern-day setting, replacing the throne of Scotland with the presidency of a high-ranked bank.

The 2021 Malayalam-language film Joji directed by Dileesh Pothan is a loose adaptation of Shakespeare's Macbeth. 

Denzel Washington was nominated to an Academy Award for his performance in the title role of Joel Coen's The Tragedy of Macbeth (2021).

The 2021 Bengali web-series Mandaar on Hoichoi, directed by Anirban Bhattacharya and starring Debasish Mondal and Sohini Sarkar, is a loose adaptation of Shakespeare's Macbeth.

In literature
There have been numerous literary adaptations and spin-offs from Macbeth. Russian novelist Nikolay Leskov told a variation of the story from Lady Macbeth's point of view in Lady Macbeth of the Mtsensk District, which itself became a number of films and an opera by Shostakovich. Maurice Baring's 1911 The Rehearsal fictionalises Shakespeare's company's inept rehearsals for Macbeths premiere. Gu Wuwei's 1916 play The Usurper of State Power adapted both Macbeth and Hamlet as a parody of contemporary events in China. The play has been used as a background for detective fiction (as in Marvin Kaye's 1976 Bullets for Macbeth) and, in the case of Ngaio Marsh's last detective novel Light Thickens, the play takes centre stage as the rehearsal, production and run of a 'flawless' production is described in absorbing detail (so much so that her biographer describes the novel as effectively Marsh's third production of the play). But the play was also used as the basis of James Thurber's parody of the whodunit genre The Macbeth Murder Mystery, in which the protagonist reads Macbeth applying the conventions of detective stories, and concludes that it must have been Macduff who murdered Duncan. Comics and graphic novels have utilised the play, or have dramatised the circumstances of its inception: Superman himself wrote the play for Shakespeare in the course of one night, in the 1947 Shakespeare's Ghost Writer. A cyberpunk version of Macbeth titled Mac appears in the collection Sound & Fury: Shakespeare Goes Punk. Terry Pratchett reimagined Macbeth in the Discworld novel Wyrd Sisters (1988). In this story 3 witches, led by Granny Weatherwax, attempts to put a murdered king's heir on the throne.

Macbeth has been adapted into plays dealing with the political and cultural concerns of many nations. Eugène Ionesco's Macbett satirised Macbeth as a meaningless succession of treachery and slaughter. Wale Ogunyemi's A'are Akogun, first performed in Nigeria in 1968, mixed the English and Yoruba languages. Welcome Msomi's 1970 play Umabatha adapts Macbeth to Zulu culture, and was said by The Independent to be "more authentic than any modern Macbeth" in presenting a world in which a man's fighting ability is central to his identity. Joe de Graft adapted Macbeth as a battle to take over a powerful corporation in Ghana in his 1972 Mambo or Let's Play Games, My Husband. Dev Virahsawmy's Zeneral Macbeff, first performed in 1982, adapted the story to the local Creole and to the Mauritian political situation. (The same author later translated Macbeth itself into Mauritian creole, as Trazedji Makbess.) And in 2000, Chuck Mike and the Nigerian Performance Studio Workshop produced Mukbutu as a direct commentary on the fragile nature of Nigerian democracy at the time. In 2018, Jo Nesbø wrote Macbeth, a retelling of the play as a thriller. The novel was part of Hogarth Shakespeare. The lines from the play have inspired titles of many works of literature, for example Agatha Christie's By the Pricking of My Thumbs. The title of the book comes from Act 4, Scene 1 of Macbeth, when the second witch says:

By the pricking of my thumbs,Something wicked this way comes.In Tripp Ainsworth's novel Six Pistols and a Dagger, Smokepit Fairytales Part VI, the events of Macbeth are meshed with those of Blackbeard as the wife of a feared space pirate initiates his downfall.

In music and audio

Macbeth is, with The Tempest, one of the two most-performed Shakespeare plays on BBC Radio, with over 20 productions between 1923 and 2022, the most recent production starring David Tennant in 2022. Other BBC Radio productions include:
 1934 - Charles Laughton
 1944 - Leslie Banks
 1947 - Howard Marion-Crawford
 1956 - Michael Hordern
 1966 - Paul Scofield
 1971 - Joss Ackland
 1984 - Denis Quilley
 1991 - Ian Holm
 1991 - Tim McInnerny
 1995 - Steven Berkoff
 2000 - Ken Stott
 2015 - Neil Dudgeon

One of the best-known recorded productions, starring Anthony Quayle and Gwen Ffrangcon-Davies, was released as part of the Shakespeare Recording Society unabridged productions in 1960 by Caedmon Records (SRS-M-231). Other unabridged recorded productions have been released by the Marlowe Society (Argo Records ZPR 201-3), the Old Vic Company (HMV ALP 1176) with Alec Guinness and Pamela Brown, and the Complete Arkangel Shakespeare with Hugh Ross and Harriet Walter

The extant version of Macbeth, in the First Folio, contains dancing and music, including the song "Come Away Hecate" which exists in two collections of lute music (both c.1630, one of them being Drexel 4175) arranged by Robert Johnson. And, from the Restoration onwards, incidental music has frequently been composed for the play: including works by William Boyce in the eighteenth century. Davenant's use of dance in the witches' scenes was inherited by Garrick, which in turn influenced Giuseppe Verdi to incorporate a ballet around the witches' cauldron into his opera Macbeth. Verdi's first Shakespeare-influenced opera, with libretto by Francesco Maria Piave, incorporated a number of striking arias for Lady Macbeth, giving her a prominence in the early part of the play which contrasts with the character's increasing isolation as the action continues: she ceases to sing duets and her sleepwalking confession is starkly contrasted with the "supported grief" of Macduff in the preceding scene. Other music influenced by the play includes Richard Strauss's 1890 symphonic poem Macbeth. Duke Ellington and Billy Strayhorn incorporated themes depicting the female characters from Macbeth in the 1957 Shakespearean jazz suite Such Sweet Thunder: the weird sisters juxtaposed with Iago (from Othello), and Lady Mac represented by ragtime piano because, as Ellington put it, "we suspect there was a little ragtime in her soul". Another Jazz collaboration to create hybrids of Shakespeare plays was that of Cleo Laine with Johnny Dankworth, who in Laine's 1964 Shakespeare and All That Jazz juxtaposed Titania's instructions to her fairies from A Midsummer Night's Dream with the witches' chant from Macbeth. In 2000, Jag Panzer produced their heavy metal concept-album retelling Thane to the Throne. In 2017, pianist John Burke scored an outdoor production of Macbeth.

In the musical Hamilton by Lin-Manuel Miranda several characters and a direct quote from the second line of Macbeth's Act 5 soliloquy ("Tomorrow and tomorrow and tomorrow...") are referenced in the song "Take a Break." The titular character also states his enemies see him as Macbeth, grabbing power for power's sake.

In the visual arts
The play has inspired numerous works of art. In 1750 and 1760 respectively, the painters John Wootton and Francesco Zuccarelli portrayed Macbeth and Banquo meeting the Three Witches in a scenic landscape, both likely having been inspired by Gaspard Dughet's 1653–4 painting Landscape in a Storm. While Wootton's extended visualization was ultimately more significant, Zuccarelli's allegorical version became available to a much wider constituency, through its 1767 exhibition with the Society of Artists and its subsequent engraving by William Woollett in 1770. The scene in which Lady Macbeth seizes the daggers, as performed by Garrick and Mrs. Pritchard, was a touchstone throughout Henry Fuseli's career, including works in 1766, 1774 and 1812. The same performance was the subject of Johann Zoffany's painting of the Macbeths in 1768. In 1786, John Boydell announced his intention to found his Shakespeare Gallery. His chief innovation was to see the works of Shakespeare as history, rather than contemporary, so instead of including the (then fashionable) works depicting the great actors of the day on stage in modern dress, he commissioned works depicting the action of the plays. However the most notable works in the collection disregard this historicising principle: such as Fuseli's depiction of the naked and heroic Macbeth encountering the witches. William Blake's paintings were also influenced by Shakespeare, including his Pity, inspired by Macbeth's "Pity, like a naked new-born babe, striding the blast." Sarah Siddons' triumph in the role of Lady Macbeth led Joshua Reynolds to depict her as The Muse of Tragedy.

Notes

Citations
Unless otherwise specified, all citations of Macbeth refer to Muir (1984), and of other works of Shakespeare refer to Wells and Taylor (2005).

References

 Banham, Martin; Mooneeram, Roshni and Plastow, Jane Shakespeare and Africa in Wells and Stanton (2002, 284–299)

 
 Billington, Michael Shakespeare and the Modern British Theatre in Wells and Orlin (2003, 595–606)

 Bloom, Harold (2008). Introduction. In Macbeth: Bloom's Shakespeare Through the Ages. Ed. Harold Bloom. New York: Chelsea House. .
 Booth, Michael R. (1995) "Nineteenth-Century Theatre" in Brown (1995, 299–340)

 Brooke, Nicholas, ed. (1990). The Tragedy of Macbeth. By William Shakespeare. The Oxford Shakespeare ser. Oxford: Oxford University Press. .

 
 Clark, Sandra and Pamela Mason, eds. (2015). Macbeth. By William Shakespeare. Arden Third ser. London: The Arden Shakespeare. . 

 Forsyth, Neil Shakespeare the Illusionist: Filming the Supernatural in Jackson (2000, 274–294)
 Freedman, Barbara Critical Junctures in Shakespeare Screen History: The Case of Richard III in Jackson (2000, 47–71)

 Gay, Penny Women and Shakespearean Performance in Wells and Stanton (2002, 155–173)
 Gillies, John; Minami, Ryuta; Li, Ruri and Trivedi, Poonam Shakespeare on the Stages of Asia in Wells and Stanton (2002, 259–283)
 Greenhalgh, Susanne Shakespeare Overheard: Performances, Adaptations and Citations on Radio in Shaughnessy (2007, 175–198).
 Guntner, J. Lawrence Hamlet, Macbeth and King Lear on Film in Jackson (2000, 117–134), especially the section Macbeth: of Kings, Castles and Witches at 123–128.
 Gurr, Andrew. 1992. The Shakespearean Stage 1574-1642. Third ed. Cambridge: Cambridge University Press. . 

 Hawkes, Terence Shakespeare's Afterlife: Introduction in Welles and Orlin (2003, 571–581)

 Holland, Peter Touring Shakespeare in Wells and Stanton (2002, 194–211)
 Holland, Peter Shakespeare Abbreviated in Shaughnessy (2007, 26–45)
 Hortmann, Wilhelm Shakespeare on the Political Stage in the Twentieth Century in Wells and Stanton (2002, 212–229)
 Howard, Tony Shakespeare on Film and Video in Wells and Orlin (2003, 607–619)

 Jess-Cooke, Carolyn Screening the McShakespeare in Post-Millennial Shakespeare Cinema in Burnett and Wray (2006, 163–184).

 Marsden, Jean I. “Improving Shakespeare: From the Restoration to Garrick.” The Cambridge Companion to Shakespeare on Stage, Cambridge UP, Cambridge, England, 2002, pp. 21–36.

 Mason, Pamela Orson Welles and Filmed Shakespeare in Jackson (2000, 183–198), especially the section Macbeth (1948) at 184–189.

 McLuskie, Kathleen Shakespeare Goes Slumming: Harlem '37 and Birmingham '97 in Hodgdon & Worthen (2005, 249–266)
 Moody, Jane Romantic Shakespeare in Wells and Stanton (2002, 37–57).
 Morrison, Michael A. Shakespeare in North America in Wells and Stanton (2002, 230–258)

 O'Connor, Marion Reconstructive Shakespeare: Reproducing Elizabethan and Jacobean Stages in Wells and Stanton (2002, 76–97)

 Orgel, Stephen Shakespeare Illustrated in Shaughnessy (2007, 67–92)
 Osborne, Laurie Narration and Staging in Hamlet and its Afternovels in Shaughnessy (2007, 114–133)

 Potter, Lois Shakespeare in the Theatre, 1660–1900 in Wells and de Grazia (2001, 183–198)

 Schoch, Richard W. Pictorial Shakespeare in Wells and Stanton (2002, 58–75)

 Smallwood, Robert Twentieth-Century Performance: The Stratford and London Companies in Wells and Stanton (2002, 98–117)

 Tatspaugh, Patricia Performance History: Shakespeare on the Stage 1660–2001 in Wells and Orlin (2003, 525–549)
 Taylor, Gary Shakespeare Plays on Renaissance Stages in Wells and Stanton (2002, 1–20)
 Thomson, Peter. 1992. Shakespeare's Theatre. 2nd ed. Theatre Production Studies ser. London: Routledge. .

 Wickham, Glynne. (1969). Shakespeare's Dramatic Heritage: Collected Studies in Mediaeval, Tudor and Shakespearean Drama. London: Routledge. .
 Willems, Michèle Video and its Paradoxes in Jackson (2000, 35–46)
 Williams, Simon The Tragic Actor and Shakespeare in Wells and Stanton (2002, 118–136)

External links

 Performances and Photographs from London and Stratford performances of Macbeth 1960–2000 – From the Designing Shakespeare resource
 Macbeth at the British Library
 Macbeth on Film
 PBS Video directed by Rupert Goold starring Sir Patrick Stewart
 Annotated Text at The Shakespeare Project – annotated HTML version of Macbeth.
 Macbeth Navigator – searchable, annotated HTML version of Macbeth.
 
 Macbeth Analysis and Textual Notes
 Annotated Bibliography of Macbeth Criticism
 Macbeth - full annotated text aligned to Common Core Standards
 Shakespeare and the Uses of Power by Steven Greenblatt

Macbeth
1603 plays
English Renaissance plays
Regicides
Plays set in the 11th century
Plays set in Scotland
Cultural depictions of Scottish kings
British plays adapted into films
Plays based on real people
Fiction about suicide
Plays about Scottish royalty
Fiction about regicide
Witchcraft in written fiction